The Missisquoi North River is a tributary of the Missisquoi River. The Missisquoi North River flows through the municipalities of Eastman, Stukely-Sud, Saint-Étienne-de-Bolton, Bolton-Est, Mansonville and Potton, in the Memphrémagog Regional County Municipality, in the administrative region of Estrie, in Quebec, in Canada.

Geography 
The main hydrographic slopes near the Missisquoi North river are:
 North side: Yamaska River, Noire River (Yamaska River);
 East side: Étang stream, Brulé stream, Province Hill stream, Lake Memphremagog;
 South side: Missisquoi River;
 West side: Missisquoi River.

Upper river course

The Missisquoi North River originates west of Lake Stukely and south of North Stukely. Two streams (coming from the north and the northwest) flow into Parker Lake.

This lake is fed by "Long Pond Lake" which flows onto the east shore of Trousers Lake.

River course downstream of Trousers Lake (segment of )

From Trousers Lake, the river flows on:
  south to the outlet (coming from the north) of Étang Grass;
  south by collecting the discharge from the Petite rivière Missisquoi Nord (coming form North) to the outlet (from the east) of the Étang Olive;
  south to the Nicolas-Austin road bridge at Bolton-Est;
  south to Ives stream (coming from the west);
  south to the outlet (from the east) of Johnson Pond;
  south to West Field Creek (coming from the west);

The Missisquoi River North flows on the north bank of the Missisquoi River in the municipality of Potton, opposite the hamlet of Highwater.

Toponymy 
The term "missisquoi" in Abenaki means "multitudes of water birds", which takes on this river all its meaning.

The toponym "Rivière Missisquoi Nord" was formalized on December 5, 1968, at the Commission de toponymie du Québec.

External links

Notes and references

See also 
 Potton, a municipality
 Mansonville, a municipality
 Bolton-Est, a municipality
 Saint-Étienne-de-Bolton, a municipality
 Stukely-Sud, a municipality
 Eastman, a municipality
 Memphrémagog Regional County Municipality
 Missisquoi River, a stream
 Petite rivière Missisquoi Nord, a stream
 List of rivers of Quebec

Rivers of Estrie